Mohammed Dif is a paralympic athlete from Morocco competing mainly in category F46 long jump events.

Mohammed won a silver medal in the long jump at the 2004 Summer Paralympics in Athens, Greece.

References

Paralympic athletes of Morocco
Athletes (track and field) at the 2004 Summer Paralympics
Paralympic silver medalists for Morocco
Moroccan male long jumpers
Living people
Medalists at the 2004 Summer Paralympics
Year of birth missing (living people)
Paralympic medalists in athletics (track and field)
21st-century Moroccan people